New York State Route 9C  may refer to:
New York State Route 9C (1920s–1930) in the Capital District
New York State Route 9C (1930 – early 1930s) in the Lower Hudson Valley